The Sewerage (Scotland) Act 1968 (1968 c.47) is an Act of the Parliament of the United Kingdom which required every local authority in Scotland to provide a network of sewers to ensure that domestic sewage, surface water and trade effluent was effectively drained from their area, and to construct sewage treatment works or other facilities to deal with the contents of those sewers.

Implementation
The Act was an attempt to improve the provision of sewerage services in Scotland, by requiring local authorities to provide a network of sewers and treatment works or other facilities to deal with the contents of those sewers. Local authorities were further required to ensure that the sewer network was accessible to owners of premises, enabling them to connect to the network "at a reasonable cost". However, this concept was also applied to the local authority, who did not have to do anything that was not practicable at a reasonable cost. In the event that agreement could not be reached as to what was reasonable cost, the matter could be referred to the Secretary of State, and his decision would be binding.

The Act was divided into three parts, with part I covering general provisions as to sewerage in sections 1 to 23, part 2 covering trade effluents in sections 24 to 38, and part 3 covering miscellaneous and general provision in sections 39 to 61. There were two schedules attached to the end of the Act. Section 5 allowed local authorities to collaborate by connecting their sewerage systems or treatment works together to be more effective. Section 10 allowed them to arrange to empty septic tanks within their area on a regular basis, provided that they did not contain trade effluent, while section 11 required them to keep maps showing where the public sewers were located. The maps were to distinguish between sewers for foul water and those for surface water where this was relevant.

Part 2 gave traders a legal right to discharge trade effluent into the public sewers, where such effluent was produced within their premises. Such discharges had to be notified to the local authority, to specify the nature, composition and temperature of the discharge, the maximum volume per day that would be discharged, and the maximum hourly rate at which it would enter the sewers. Section 29 listed a number of conditions on what could be discharged, as well as on whether it needed to be pre-treated, and the local authority could make charges to cover the costs of treating such discharges.

Many of the provisions of part 3 were quite mundane, but section 40 allowed local authorities to conduct research into the problems of sewerage and sewage treatment, or to make contributions towards such research. They could publish information about such problems, arrange seminars or lectures about them, hold exhibitions which included pictures, models or films, and could finance the production of pictures, models or films, either directly or in collaboration with others.

Subsequently, to the passing of the Act, the nature of "reasonable cost" has been defined more precisely, and from 1 April 2006, The  Provision of Water and Sewerage Services (Reasonable  Costs) (Scotland) Regulations  2006 came into force. These limited the maximum cost to a domestic customer for connecting to the sewerage network to £1,500. The original Act gave local authorities, and Scottish Water who have subsequently taken over the roles of the local authorities in the provision of sewerage services, the power to specify the location and mode of connection where a customer may connect to the public sewers, in order to prevent the disruption of the existing network. This is quite different to the law in England and Wales, where the High Court ruled that the Water Industry Act 1991 did not contain a similar condition, when judging a dispute between Barratt Homes and Welsh Water, and that the connection could thus be made in a way that would result in the sewers being overloaded.

Bibliography

References

United Kingdom Acts of Parliament 1968
Acts of the Parliament of the United Kingdom concerning Scotland
1968 in Scotland
Water supply and sanitation in Scotland